Aaron Teroi (born 2 October 1995) is a Cook Islands international rugby league footballer who plays as a and  for the Central Queensland Capras in Intrust Super Cup.

Background
Born in Melbourne, Victoria, Australia. Teroi was educated at Craigieburn Secondary College.

He played his junior rugby league for the Northern Thunder RLFC in Broadmeadows before being signed by the Melbourne Storm.

Playing career
In 2012 and 2013, Teroi played for Melbourne Storm's SG Ball Cup side. In 2014 and 2015, he played for Melbourne's NYC side, being awarded the Greg Brentnall Victorian Young Achievers award at the end of the 2015 season.

In October 2015, Teroi made his international début for the Cook Islands in the 2017 Rugby League World Cup qualification Asia-Pacific play-off.

In January 2016, Teroi joined the Newcastle Thunder in England's Kingstone Press League 1.

References

External links
Newcastle Thunder profile

1995 births
Living people
Australian rugby league players
Australian people of Cook Island descent
Central Queensland Capras players
Cook Islands national rugby league team players
Newcastle Thunder players
Rugby league halfbacks
Rugby league hookers
Rugby league players from Melbourne
Australian expatriate rugby league players
Australian expatriate sportspeople in England
Expatriate rugby league players in England
Cook Island expatriate rugby league players
Cook Island expatriate sportspeople in England